The 2021 Bredene Koksijde Classic was the 18th edition of the Bredene Koksijde Classic road cycling one day race, which was held on 19 March 2021, starting and finishing in the titular towns of Bredene and Koksijde, respectively. The 1.Pro-category race was initially scheduled to be a part of the inaugural edition of the UCI ProSeries, but after the 2020 edition was cancelled due to the COVID-19 pandemic, it made its UCI ProSeries debut in 2021, while also still being a part of the 2021 UCI Europe Tour.

The race was won in a sprint by Tim Merlier ahead of Mads Pedersen and Florian Sénéchal.

Teams 
Twelve of the nineteen UCI WorldTeams, ten UCI ProTeams, and three UCI Continental teams made up the twenty-five teams that participated in the race.

UCI WorldTeams

 
 
 
 
 
 
 
 
 
 
 
 

UCI ProTeams

 
 
 
 
 
 
 
 
 
 

UCI Continental Teams

Result

References

External links 
 

2021
Bredene Koksijde Classic
Bredene Koksijde Classic
Bredene Koksijde Classic
Bredene Koksijde Classic